Elizabeth Riddell (21 March 1910 – 3 July 1998) was an Australian poet and journalist.

Life
Born in Napier, New Zealand, Elizabeth Richmond Riddell came to Australia in 1928 where she worked at Smith's Weekly and won a Walkley Award.

She married Edward Neville 'Blue' Greatorex (1901–1964) in Sydney in 1935. The couple did not have children. In 1935 she moved to England and during World War II worked for Ezra Norton at The Daily Mirror, chiefly in New York City. Her first short book of poems, The Untrammelled, was published in 1940. After the war she returned to Australia to continue working as a journalist, and in the 1960s became art critic and feature writer for The Australian. She was the first Walkley Award winner for The Australian, winning in 1968 and 1969 for 'Best Newspaper Feature Story'. In 1986 she was awarded Critic of the Year by the Australian Book Review. Riddell's poetry won the Kenneth Slessor Prize for Poetry in 1992 and the Patrick White Award in 1995.

Widowed in 1964, Riddell died in 1998.

Bibliography 

 The Untrammelled. Sydney: Viking, 1940.
 Poems. Sydney: Ure Smith, 1948.
 Song for a Crowning. W. H. Paling, 1953. Songs with music by G. S. English.
 Forbears. Sydney: Angus & Robertson, 1961.
 Country Tune. J. Albert, 1973. Songs with music by G. S. English.
 From the midnight courtyard. Angus & Robertson, 1989.
 Selected Poems. Angus & Robertson, 1992.
 The Difficult Island. Molonglo, 1994.

References

External links 
 His Day poem
 The Letter poem
 Elizabeth Riddell Video interview & transcript

1910 births
1998 deaths
Australian art critics
New Zealand emigrants to Australia
People from Napier, New Zealand
Patrick White Award winners
ALS Gold Medal winners
Australian women art critics
Australian women journalists
Australian women poets
20th-century Australian women writers
20th-century Australian poets
20th-century Australian journalists